Cousinia multiloba is a species of flowering plants in the tribe Cardueae. It is found in Iran and Afghanistan.

References

External links 
 
 Cousinia multiloba at Tropicos
 Cousinia multiloba at the International Plant Name Index (IPNI)

Cynareae
Plants described in 1837